The International Day for Monuments and Sites also known as World Heritage Day is an international observance held on 18 April each year around the world with different types of activities, including visits to monuments and heritage sites, conferences, round tables and newspaper articles. Each year has a theme, for example sustainable tourism in 2017 and rural landscapes in 2019.

History 
The International Day for Monuments and Sites was proposed by the International Council on Monuments and Sites (ICOMOS) on 18 April 1982 and approved by the General Assembly of UNESCO in 1983. The aim is to promote awareness about the diversity of cultural heritage of humanity, their vulnerability and the efforts required for their protection and conservation.

Convention Concerning the Protection of the World Cultural and Natural Heritage
The Convention Concerning the Protection of the World Cultural and Natural Heritage defines monument as:

International Year of the Monument

The International Year of the Monument was a commemorative date created by UNESCO in 1964. The implementation of the date was to give a better global coverage in the perception of the monument as a building or historical site of exemplary character, for its significance in the life trajectory of a society/community and its people. There are monuments built especially to celebrate or reminisce about an episode, moment or character of our history, created by architects, sculptors, artists, etc. Others are remnants of the past that survived the time and are consecrated by society as collective symbols, and as references of the memory of a people.

References

External links 
 

United Nations days
UNESCO
April observances